A number of steamships have been named Mercator, including –

, a Finnish cargo ship in service 1891–1916. Torpedoed and sunk in 1916.
, a Finnish cargo ship in service 1925–39. Torpedoed and sunk on 1 December.
, a Finnish cargo ship in service 1942–44, 1948–59. Scrapped in 1959.

See also
, a Landing Ship Tank, ex-USS LST-310. In service under this name between 1951 and 1963 for Norwegian, American and Argentinian owners.

Ship names